The Little Bookroom is a collection of twenty-seven stories for children by Eleanor Farjeon, published by Oxford University Press in 1955 with illustrations by Edward Ardizzone. They were selected by the author from stories published earlier in her career. Most were in the fairy tale style.

Next year Farjeon won the inaugural Hans Christian Andersen International Medal, recognising her career contribution to children's literature as a writer. She also won the annual Carnegie Medal, recognising The Little Bookroom as the year's  best children's book by a British subject.

Oxford published a U.S. edition in 1956 with a long title, as catalogued by the national library: The Little Bookroom: Eleanor Farjeon's short stories for children, chosen by herself.

The title 

One room in the house of her childhood was called "the little bookroom", Farjeon explains in the Author's Note. Although there were many books all over the house, this dusty room was like an untended garden, full to the ceiling of stray, left-over books, opening "magic casements" on to other times and places for the young Eleanor, filling her mind with a silver-cobwebby mixture of fact, fancy and romance which influenced all her later writing. "Seven maids with seven brooms, sweeping for half-a-hundred years, have never managed to clear my mind of its dust of vanished temples and flowers and kings, the curls of ladies, the sighing of poets, the laughter of lads and girls."

The stories 

The four longest of 27 stories (‡) constitute one-third of the collection by length.

The King and the Corn
The King's Daughter Cries for the Moon ‡
Young Kate
The Flower Without a Name
The Goldfish
The Clumber Pup ‡
The Miracle of the Poor Island
The Girl Who Kissed the Peach-Tree
Westwoods
The Barrel-Organ
The Giant and the Mite
The Little Dressmaker
The Lady's Room
The Seventh Princess
Leaving Paradise ‡
The Little Lady's Roses
In Those Days
The Connemara Donkey
The Tims
Pennyworth
And I Dance Mine Own Child ‡
The Lovebirds
San Fairy Ann
The Glass Peacock
The Kind Farmer
Old Surly and the Boy
Pannychis

The illustrations
The black-and-white illustrations by Edward Ardizzone have been described as evoking "the magical atmosphere of the stories".<ref>[https://books.google.com/books/about/The_Little_Bookroom.html?id=FFoNKQEACAAJ The Little Bookroom at Google Books]</ref> Although the librarians judged no 1955 book suitable for the newly established Kate Greenaway Medal for children's book illustration, a year later Ardizzone won the first-awarded Greenaway Medal for Tim All Alone (1956) which he also wrote.

Literary significance and reception

In England the best work of the years after the First World War was mainly in poetry, or fantasy, or poetic fantasy; in particular there was a spate of original stories in the folk-tale manner. Eleanor Farjeon was above all a poet, but from the 1920s onward she effectively used poetic language and fancy in creating literary but homely fairy tales for children, as did her fellow poet, Walter de la Mare. The "literary fairy tale" recreates traditional fairy tales and folktales in several respects, such as clear distinctions between good and evil, and their inevitable reward and punishment. Writing in this genre, Farjeon was one of the foremost 20th century followers of Hans Christian Andersen, which makes it fitting that she was the first recipient of the Hans Christian Andersen Award in 1956. Although the award recognises an author's or illustrator's whole body of work, the publication of The Little Bookroom provided an impetus for the award. Similarly, the 1955 Carnegie Medal was considered a recognition of Eleanor Farjeon's contribution to children's literature as a whole, echoing the 1947 award to Walter de la Mare for Collected Stories for Children''.

Publication history

Puffin Books (1977) retained the original cover and interior illustrations by Edward Ardizzone (see image).
 
New York Review Books published an edition in 2003 with afterword by Rumer Godden, retaining the original illustrations.

The 2004 Oxford edition used a new cover illustration.

See also

References

External links
  —immediately, a 1955(?) US edition 
 
 Translations of The Little Bookroom

1955 short story collections
British short story collections
Children's short story collections
Fantasy short story collections
Carnegie Medal in Literature winning works
1955 children's books
Oxford University Press books